Hans Menasse (5 March 1930 – 28 February 2022) was an Austrian footballer who played as a right winger. Menasse, who was Jewish, was evacuated to the United Kingdom as a child, where he grew up, beginning his career at Luton Town. He played in two matches for the Austria national team from 1953 to 1954. Menasse died on 28 February 2022, at the age of 91.

References

External links
 

1930 births
2022 deaths
Austrian Jews
Austrian footballers
Association football wingers
Austria international footballers
Footballers from Vienna
Luton Town F.C. players
First Vienna FC players
FK Austria Wien players
1. Wiener Neustädter SC players